Shon Seung-mo (Hangul: 손승모; born 1 July 1980 in Milyang, Gyeongsangnam-do) is a badminton player from South Korea. In 2004, he won the silver medal at the Athens Summer Olympics.

Career

Olympic Games
He competed at the 2000 and 2004 Summer Olympics.
In 2004, he defeating Antti Viitikko of Finland and Richard Vaughan of Great Britain in the first two rounds. In the quarterfinals, Shon defeated Chen Hong of People's Republic of China 10-15, 15-4, 15-10.  Shon advanced to the semifinals, in which he beat Sony Dwi Kuncoro of Indonesia 15-6, 9-15, 15-9. Playing in the gold medal match, he lost to Indonesian Taufik Hidayat by a score of 15-8, 15-7 to finish with the silver medal.

Shon's right eye is almost blind, after being hit in the eye by a shuttlecock when he was 15 years of age.

Achievements

Olympic Games
Men's singles

World Championships
Men's singles

World Cup 
Men's singles

Asian Games
Men's singles

Asian Championships
Men's singles

Asian Junior Championships 
Boys' singles

Grand Prix
The World Badminton Grand Prix sanctioned by International Badminton Federation (IBF) since 1983.

Men's singles

BWF International Challenge/Series
Men's singles

 BWF International Challenge tournament
 BWF International Series tournament

Record Against Selected Opponents
Includes results against Super Series finalists, World Championships semifinalists, and Olympic quarterfinalists.

  Bao Chunlai 1-3
  Chen Hong 3-2
  Chen Yu 0-3
  Lin Dan 1-6
  Xia Xuanze 0-2
  Hsieh Yu-hsing 2-0
  Peter Gade 0-2
  Jan Ø. Jørgensen 1-0
  Joachim Persson 1-1
  Antti Viitikko 1-0
  Hendrawan 0-1
  Taufik Hidayat 1-4
  Sony Dwi Kuncoro 2-3
  Simon Santoso 0-1
  Ardy Wiranata 0-1
  Lee Hyun-il 1-2
  Park Sung-hwan 2-0
  Park Tae-sang 1-1
  Lee Chong Wei 0-2
  Rashid Sidek 0-2
  Wong Choong Hann 2-3
  Ronald Susilo 4-3
  Boonsak Ponsana 3-1
  Richard Vaughan 2-0

References

External links
 
 
 
 
 

South Korean male badminton players
1980 births
Living people
People from Miryang
Badminton players at the 2004 Summer Olympics
Olympic badminton players of South Korea
Olympic silver medalists for South Korea
Olympic medalists in badminton
Asian Games medalists in badminton
Medalists at the 2004 Summer Olympics
Badminton players at the 2006 Asian Games
Badminton players at the 2002 Asian Games
Asian Games gold medalists for South Korea
Asian Games silver medalists for South Korea
Asian Games bronze medalists for South Korea
Medalists at the 2002 Asian Games
Medalists at the 2006 Asian Games
Badminton players at the 2000 Summer Olympics
Sportspeople from South Gyeongsang Province